Gordon L. Ropp (April 5, 1933 – April 14, 2020) was an American farmer and politician.

Ropp was born in Normal, Illinois and graduated from Normal Community High School. He graduated from University of Illinois in 1955. Ropp served in the Illinois National Guard and was commissioned a captain. Ropp was a farmer and raised dairy cows. Ropp served as Illinois Director of Agriculture. Ropp, a Republican, served in the Illinois House of Representatives from 1979 to 1993. Ropp lost the 1992 Republican primary to Bill Brady.

Ropp died at his home in Normal, Illinois.

Notes

1933 births
2020 deaths
People from Normal, Illinois
Illinois National Guard personnel
Farmers from Illinois
University of Illinois alumni
Republican Party members of the Illinois House of Representatives